The Mausoleum of Yugoslav Soldiers is a neoclassical chapel with an ossuary containing remains of Yugoslav soldiers killed in the First World War. It was built in 1926 in Bezruč Park in Olomouc, Czechoslovakia (now the Czech Republic) by the Czechoslovak-Yugoslav League. The designer of the chapel was architect Hubert Aust. 
The mausoleum was owned by Yugoslavia until its breakup. It was in bad shape for long time. The renovation has been prevented because of unclear property rights. Reconstruction was done 2016 - 2020. Mausoleum is now owned by the city of Olomouc (was taken from previous owner -- Kingdom of Jugoslavia by Czech court. The reason was that Kingdon of Jugoslavia doesn't exist anymore and none of the ex-Jugoslavia countries want to take care). Second bigger Mausoleum of Yugoslav Soldiers in Czech Republic is in Jindřichovice (near  Karlovy Vary). It has 7378 body remains.

Characteristics
The chapel is 11 metres high, topped with a dome. A two-branch staircase leads to the chapel entrance behind 12 Doric columns standing in three rows. An epigraph on the chapel reads: VĚRNOST ZA VĚRNOST – LJUBAV ZA LJUBAV (the first part is in Czech and means 'loyalty for loyalty', the second part is in Serbo-Croatian and means 'love for love'). The building stands on an artificial mound, inside of which is the ossuary. The entrance to the ossuary is a portal with a sandstone relief of a mourning woman and national emblems of Yugoslavia and Czechoslovakia. It contains the remains of more than 1,100 Yugoslav soldiers who died in Olomouc military hospitals.

Body Remains 
Body remains (bones) are stored in quite small coffins (boxes). The reason is that at the time the Mausoleum was built (1928) the body remains were already buried in various cemeteries across Moravia and Silesia. The body remains of individual soldiers (but not their original coffins) were taken from their original burry place and moved to the Mausoleum. (And put in a small box).

37 of them were Serbian prisoners of war (nowadays Czech Republic was part of Austrian-Hungarian empire and fighting against Serbia in WW1). The rest of them were Austrian-Hungarian soldiers who were ethnically Serbs, Slovenians or Croatians (Slovenia, Bosnia and Croatia were part of Austria-Hungary).

Few of the body remains belongs to the ethnic Czechs (Croatian Czechs).

Condition and plans of renovation

The mausoleum is in a bad condition due to both natural effects and vandalism, and therefore it is not open to the public. The stairs and electrical wiring are in the greatest disrepair. Frescoes of saints painted in the Byzantine style are also partly damaged.

The entrance to the ossuary used to be closed with a grill and a wooden door, which were destroyed by vandals who also destroyed several wooden coffins and stole some skulls and other bones. As a result, the portal was walled up in 1990. Thanks to this, the ossuary was saved from the flood which struck Olomouc in 1997. The entrance was reopened in 1998 to assess the range of necessary repairs and to stop the spread of mould, and was then walled up again.

The first attempt at renovation was begun with negotiations with its official owner, the Socialist Federal Republic of Yugoslavia, in the beginning of the 1990s, but in 1992 Yugoslavia disintegrated and the negotiations were stopped.

In 2006 an agreement was made with the embassy of Slovenia as one of the successor states. It was expected that repairs would cost 12.5 million Czech crowns, with the money coming from the city of Olomouc, European Structural Funds and the Czech Ministry of Culture. However, the project was suspended by the end of the year because the problems with property rights made the request for the European funding impossible.

References

Monuments and memorials in the Czech Republic
Christian buildings and structures
Mausoleums in the Czech Republic
Buildings and structures in Olomouc
World War I memorials
Buildings and structures completed in 1926
Neoclassical architecture
Military of Yugoslavia
Czechoslovakia–Yugoslavia relations